The 2008 Generac 500 at Road America presented by Time Warner Cable was the seventh round of the 2008 American Le Mans Series season.  It took place at Road America, Wisconsin on August 9, 2008.

Race results
Class winners in bold.  Cars failing to complete 70% of winner's distance marked as Not Classified (NC).

Statistics
 Pole Position - #1 Audi Sport North America - 1:46.935
 Fastest Lap - #2 Audi Sport North America - 1:48.723
 Average Speed -

References

Road America
Road America 500
Road America 500